Clarence Thomas Fieber (September 4, 1913 – August 20, 1985) was a pitcher in Major League Baseball. Nicknamed "Lefty", he played for the Chicago White Sox in 1932.

References

External links

1913 births
1985 deaths
Major League Baseball pitchers
Chicago White Sox players
Baseball players from San Francisco
San Francisco Dons baseball players